Professor Dian Donnai  (born 1945) is a British medical geneticist.

Biography
Donnai studied at St Mary's Hospital Medical School, then trained in paediatrics at St Mary's Hospital, Northwick Park Hospital and in Sheffield.

She obtained a senior registrar training post in medical genetics at Saint Mary's Hospital, Manchester in 1978, becoming a consultant in 1980.

The University of Manchester appointed her an honorary professor of medical genetics in 1994, and gave her a substantive chair in 2001.

She served as president of the Clinical Genetics Society from 1997 to 1999; as consultant advisor to the United Kingdom's Chief Medical Officer from 1998 to 2004; and as president of the European Society of Human Genetics from 2009 2010.

Together with Margaret Barrow, she first described the genetic disorder 'Donnai–Barrow syndrome', in 1993.

She was made a Commander of the Order of the British Empire (CBE) in the 2005 New Year Honours, for services to medicine, and has also been elected a Fellow of the Royal College of Physicians (FRCP), a Fellow of the Royal College of Obstetricians and Gynaecologists "" (FRCOG (ad eundem)), and a Fellow of the Academy of Medical Sciences (FMedSci).

References

External links 
 

1945 births
Place of birth missing (living people)
Living people
British geneticists
Medical geneticists
Commanders of the Order of the British Empire
Fellows of the Royal College of Physicians
Fellows of the Royal College of Obstetricians and Gynaecologists
Fellows of the Academy of Medical Sciences (United Kingdom)
Academics of the University of Manchester